Willard Owen Poole was a college football player.

College football
Pool played center for the Georgia Tech Yellow Jackets of the Georgia Institute of Technology. He entered Tech in the fall of 1923, and played on the freshman team. Pool was selected All-Southern in 1925 and 1926, and was captain in 1926. He "bested every center in the North or the South who opposed him, and left no doubt in the minds of the spectators who was the better man."

References

External links 

 

American football centers
Georgia Tech Yellow Jackets football players
All-Southern college football players